Kainji Lake, in North Central Nigeria, is a reservoir on the Niger River, formed by the Kainji Dam. It was formed in 1968 and is a part of Niger State and Kebbi State. Kainji Lake National Park (KNLP), situated around the lake, is Nigeria's oldest National Park, established in 1976.

Kanji Dam
The Kainji Dam is situated in Northern Niger State and generates power for most towns in Nigeria. It was built from 1964 to 1968 and cost about 209 million dollars, a quarter of which was used to relocate the original population. It has a capacity of 12 turbines producing a total of 960 MW, but only 8 were installed, producing 760 MW. Part of the production is sold to the neighbouring country of Niger.

National Park

It comprises two sectors, Borgu Game Reserve and Zugurma Game Reserve, which are separated by Kainji Lake. The abundant wildlife in the game preserves include baboons, duikers, hippopotami, hyenas, kobs, roan antelopes, and warthogs.

Only the Borgu (western) sector is currently used for tourism; the Zugurma (eastern) sector lacks infrastructure, including access roads. The topography of the park is gently undulating with a general decrease in elevation from west to east. The Borgu sector is drained mainly by the Oli, Timo and Doro rivers and their tributaries, while the Zugurma sector is drained by the Maingyara and Nuwa Tizururu rivers. The vegetation of the park is typical of the Guinean forest-savanna mosaic, although in some areas it appears more Sahelian. Riparian forests occur on the banks of the larger watercourses.

Conservation issues
Although the area around the park has a relatively low population density, numerous human activities adversely affect the park. These include deforestation, uncontrolled burning and illegal grazing and are particularly prevalent in the Zugurma sector. Wild mammals occur at relatively low densities due to illegal hunting. Lake Kainji has suffered a dramatic decline as a fishery due to the high numbers of artisanal and subsistence fisherfolk using the lake. It has been suggested that a period of closure, together with controlled fishing rights may help improve fish stocks.

References

 
Lakes of Nigeria
Niger State
Kebbi State
Niger River
Reservoirs in Nigeria